The 1924 Montana Grizzlies football team represented the University of Montana in the 1924 college football season as a member of the Pacific Coast Conference (PCC). The Grizzlies were led by first-year head coach Earl Clark, played their home games at Dornblaser Field and finished the season with a record of four wins and four losses (4–4, 0–3 PCC).

Schedule

References

Montana
Montana Grizzlies football seasons
Montana Grizzlies football